Lordomyrma is a genus of ants in the subfamily Myrmicinae.

Distribution and habitat
The genus is known principally from Melanesia and Australia, with the one exception to this otherwise circumscribed distribution being the single species L. azumai from Japan. Most species are denizens of the leaf litter in wet forest habitat, but some are known to nest and forage arboreally.

Description
Members of the genus are small and inconspicuous, maintain colonies of modest size and tend to be shy and retiring when disturbed.

Species

Lordomyrma accuminata Stitz, 1912
Lordomyrma azumai (Santschi, 1941)
Lordomyrma bhutanensis (Baroni Urbani, 1977)
Lordomyrma caledonica (André, 1889)
Lordomyrma crawleyi Menozzi, 1923
Lordomyrma cryptocera Emery, 1897
Lordomyrma curvata Sarnat, 2006
Lordomyrma desupra Sarnat, 2006
Lordomyrma diwata Taylor, 2012
Lordomyrma emarginata Taylor, 2012
Lordomyrma epinotalis (Mann, 1919)
Lordomyrma furcifera Emery, 1897
Lordomyrma hmong Taylor, 2012
Lordomyrma idianale Taylor, 2012
Lordomyrma infundibuli Donisthorpe, 1940
Lordomyrma lakshmi Taylor, 2012
Lordomyrma leae Wheeler, 1919
Lordomyrma levifrons (Mann, 1921)
Lordomyrma limatula Taylor, 2012
Lordomyrma nigra Donisthorpe, 1941
Lordomyrma polita (Mann, 1921)
Lordomyrma punctiventris Wheeler, 1919
Lordomyrma reticulata Lucky & Sarnat, 2008
Lordomyrma rouxi (Emery, 1914)
Lordomyrma rugosa (Mann, 1921)
Lordomyrma sarasini (Emery, 1914)
Lordomyrma sinensis (Ma, Xu, Makio & DuBois, 2007)
Lordomyrma stoneri (Mann, 1925)
Lordomyrma striatella (Mann, 1921)
Lordomyrma sukuna Sarnat, 2006
Lordomyrma taylori Bharti & Ali, 2013
Lordomyrma tortuosa (Mann, 1921)
Lordomyrma vanua Lucky & Sarnat, 2008
Lordomyrma vuda Sarnat, 2006

Notes

References

External links

Myrmicinae
Ant genera